Bickenalb is a river of Moselle, France and Saarland, Germany. It flows into the Horn near Zweibrücken.

See also
List of rivers of Saarland

References

Rivers of Moselle (department)
Rivers of Saarland
Rivers of Rhineland-Palatinate
Rivers of France
Rivers of Germany
Rivers of Grand Est
International rivers of Europe